Waterford College of Further Education(WCFE), previously called the Central Technical Institute (CTI), is a Post Leaving Certificate institute located on Parnell St., Waterford city. It was founded in 1906 and thus celebrated its centenary in 2005.

It offers a range of full-time and evening courses for post Leaving Certificate students in the areas of business, industry and the arts. In 2018 it enrolled 842 full-time day students and 300 part-time day and night students

References

Buildings and structures in Waterford (city)
Education in Waterford (city)
Further education colleges in the Republic of Ireland